Beards Fork is a census-designated place (CDP) and coal town in Fayette County, West Virginia, United States that was founded as a coal town. As of the 2010 census, its population was 199.

Geography
Beards Fork is located at  (38.063720, -81.227329). Its elevation is 1,253 feet (382 m).

Beards Fork is situated between two mountain ridges in central Fayette County, and is closest to the unincorporated town of Robson.  The Post Office in Robson handles the mail for Beards Fork.

History
The community takes its name from nearby Beards Fork creek.

Transportation
Beards Fork is served by WV 61 via Beards Fork Road, a paved one-lane road maintained by the state; a creek runs parallel to the road throughout most of the inhabited portion of the valley (known locally as the 'hollow' or 'holler').

Economy
The only entity of any kind to have offices in Beards Fork is the Southern Appalachian Labor School's Community Center, a non-profit organization that primarily provides housing services and children's programs to area residents.

References

 Southern Appalachian Labor School - http://www.sals.info

Company towns in West Virginia
Census-designated places in Fayette County, West Virginia
Census-designated places in West Virginia
Coal towns in West Virginia